Jean De Backer was a Belgian athlete who mainly participated in the water polo event.

Backer competed for the Brussels Swimming and Water Polo Club, and the team was selected to represent Belgium at the 1900 Summer Olympics in Paris, France, the team won a silver medal after losing in the final against the Osborne Swimming club which represented the Great Britain, but this came after the Belgium team had beaten two French sides in the previous rounds.

See also
 List of Olympic medalists in water polo (men)

References

External links
 

Year of birth missing
Year of death missing
Olympic medalists in water polo
Belgian male water polo players
Medalists at the 1900 Summer Olympics
Olympic silver medalists for Belgium
Olympic water polo players of Belgium
Water polo players at the 1900 Summer Olympics
Place of birth missing
Place of death missing